Super Inday and the Golden Bibe is a remake of the original 1988 movie starring Maricel Soriano fantasy-adventure flick and is an official entry to 36th Metro Manila Film Festival. It is co-production of Regal Entertainment and Regal Multimedia, Inc. and was released on December 25, 2010. The film stars Marian Rivera as Super Inday and John Lapus as the Golden Bibe. The movie was distributed by GMA Pictures.

Plot
Inday (Marian Rivera) is a simple and innocent province girl with a loving mother. A fallen angel named Goldy (John Lapus) that can transform into a duck meets a tiyanak that was lost on her way to heaven, but he refuses for he cannot go to heaven until he gets a person do good and rewards him salvation. Then they met Inday. The meeting was suddenly interrupted by her neighbor to tell her that her mother is dying.

She goes to the house, just as her mother reveals the painful truth, that she was just adopted by her after her real mother abandoned her in the woman's possession and that her real parents are on Manila and dies after that. Goldy, desperately decided that she can inherit his powers and she needs only to meet his conditions and criteria. As a trick, they hitchhike along with her, disguised as a mother and daughter that will find a way to Manila. The tiyanak carries her burial casket along and they disappeared just as the bus stops at Manila. As an innocent province-grown woman with no experience at work, she applies to work for a rich family, as a maid. The man is a business man, the kids are just spoiled and the wife has a secret.

Goldy and the tiyanak try to help her secretly by giving her Goldy's golden eggs, that contain fractions of Goldy's power. The wife's youthful secret is when she sacrifices a kid to demons, she receives immortality and youthful appearance in exchange. However, she needs to sacrifice more children because her youthful appearance doesn’t last long. So she raises an army to do her bidding, until the demons requested to kill her husband's descendants. As the demonic army tried to abduct the kids, Inday (with Goldy's help), repels the attackers, but was framed and fired by the woman for her actions.

Heartbroken, she sets off to find clues of what her real mother looks like, until she found her in a market. She tracks her and rents a room nearby and lives their daily lives by selling eggs painted gold and scavenging for recyclables, until she has enough courage to confront her. The mother told the truth and introduces her to her father.

Kokang, suspicious of what's happening, stalks her employer and finds out about the secret, but is caught by the latter and hypnotized.

Until then, the demons still attack and abduct kids for sacrifices, until Amazing Jay got entangled in the mess. Inday tries and successfully repels the attack. She and Jay try to investigate, until they found Kokang, under the spell. She dispels it and runs away from the demons. She tried to transform into Super Inday, but Kokang ate the real egg containing Goldy’s power, transforming her into Copycat.

With enough power, Inday, Jay and Copycat duel with Ingrid and her demonic minions. Defeating her and driving her to die in the altar.

Few days later, Goldy and the tiyanak (later named Angelika) got their ticket to ascend to heaven. During a party, a crab monster with a human overlord appears in a pond. Inday and Jay appear and fight the monster as Goldy and Angelika ascend to Heaven.

Cast
Marian Rivera as Inday/Super Inday
Jake Cuenca as Jeffrey/Amazing J
Kenjie Anonuevo as Young Jeffrey
John Lapus as the Golden Bibe
Pokwang as Kokay/Copycat
 Jestoni Alarcon as Danny
Cherry Pie Picache as Monina
Mylene Dizon as Ingrid
Buboy Villar as Etnok
Sabrina Man as Jingky
Jairus Aquino as Daniel Jr.
Elijah Alejo as Nameless Girl
Sheena Halili as Tonette
Irma Adlawan as Lucita

Critical reaction
Philippine Entertainment Portal complained that while Super Inday was still the same as in the original film, the character of the golden bibe had changed considerably. While calling the film "respectable" and "a genuine superhero movie" that doesn't try to be something else, they found it overlong and not saying anything of importance. In contrast Click The City called the movie "awful" claiming it unsuccessfully tried to appeal to everyone by cramming in far too much, and scoring it 1.5/5.

Accolades

Awards and nominations

References

External links
 

2010 films
Philippine fantasy films
Philippine superhero films
Regal Entertainment films
Remakes of Philippine films
2010 fantasy films
2010s superhero films
Films directed by Mike Tuviera